Berkley Cox (born 3 May 1935) was an Australian rules footballer who played for Carlton in the Victorian Football League (VFL). 

Cox was an established player at City-South in Tasmania by the time he was lured to the mainland by Carlton. He appeared as a centreman in their 1962 VFL Grand Final loss to Essendon and kicked 17 goals the following season. Cox represented Tasmania at the 1966 Hobart Carnival. He was inducted into the Tasmanian Football Hall of Fame in 2005.

References

Holmesby, Russell and Main, Jim (2007). The Encyclopedia of AFL Footballers. 7th ed. Melbourne: Bas Publishing.

1935 births
Living people
Carlton Football Club players
City-South Football Club players
Australian rules footballers from Tasmania
Tasmanian Football Hall of Fame inductees